The 1986 World Fencing Championships were held in Sofia, Bulgaria. The event took place from July 25 to August 3, 1986.

Medal table

Medal summary

Men's events

Women's events

References

FIE Results

World Fencing Championships
World Fencing Championships, 1986
1980s in Sofia
Sports competitions in Sofia
International fencing competitions hosted by Bulgaria
1986 in fencing